Harrison is a town in Westchester County, New York, United States,  northeast of Manhattan. The population was 28,218 at the 2020 census.

History

Harrison was established in 1696 by a patent granted by the British government to John Harrison and three others, who had a year earlier bargained with local Native Americans to purchase an area of land above Westchester Path (an old trail that led from Manhattan to Port Chester) and below Rye Lake. Local custom holds that Harrison was given 24 hours to ride his horse around the area he could claim, and the horse couldn't swim or didn't want to get its feet wet, but this is folklore. In fact, the land below Westchester Path and along Long Island Sound had already been purchased and partly developed by the settlers of Rye, New York.

The area that became Harrison had also been sold in 1661 or 1662, and again in 1666, to Peter Disbrow, John Budd, and other investors or early residents of Rye.</ref> Disbrow and Budd evidently lost their paperwork and the land was ultimately granted to Harrison and his co-investors in 1696. So upset were the people of Rye that they seceded to the Colony of Connecticut until 1700, when the King of England ordered Rye to rejoin the Colony of New York.

The first permanent residents of Harrison's Purchase, as it was called, arrived in about 1725, and many early settlers were Quakers, who set up a Friend's Meeting House at a settlement located in the part of Harrison now called Purchase. Harrison's Purchase was administered jointly by the settlers of Rye until it was incorporated as a town on March 7, 1788, by an act of the New York State legislature.

Merritt's Hill in West Harrison was the site of the Battle of White Plains during the Revolutionary War. Regiment 182 of the Continental Army, of the 367 regiments there, was the Harrison Regiment, composed solely of people from Harrison.

During the 1830s, David Haviland settled in Harrison where he produced Haviland China which he sold in his store in New York City before returning to his native France. Today there exists a Haviland Street in the downtown business district, as well as a Haviland Road in the Sterling Ridge neighborhood of Harrison, whose only street sign is of a historic wrought iron design in scrolled shapes, quite older than many others throughout the town.

In 1867 Benjamin Holladay purchased a tract of land, which is now the campus of Manhattanville College. He constructed an elaborate granite mansion, now known as the college's Reid Castle, and an elaborate Norman-style Roman Catholic chapel for his wife. The castle hosted the King and Queen of Siam in the early 1930s. The castle was at one time known as Ophir House, in reference to different owners.

What is now the Metro-North Railroad's New Haven Line, running from Manhattan, New York City, to Greenwich, Connecticut, first came through Harrison in 1848, though the first station was not built until 1870. Before that time, Harrisonites had to flag down the train to get a ride. Harrison remained generally free of factories through the Industrial Revolution, while large factory districts grew in the neighboring towns of White Plains, Port Chester and Mamaroneck.

In 1929, the Hutchinson River Parkway was extended to Harrison.

Sunny Ridge 
In 1929, Harrison's former Sunnyridge Farm, located less than a half mile from the train station, was purchased by real estate developer Sidney H. Sonn, of H. & S. Sonn, Co. of New York City, and subdivided into lots for a real estate development. H. & S. Sonn laid out new streets throughout, preserving the farm's private access road to the farm residence as today's Sunny Ridge Road. According to a 1928 New York Times article, "[H. & S. Sonn] virtually transformed their part of the old farm into a park, installed winding tree-lined motorways and water, gas, sewers, and electricity, and landscaped the entire 165 acres, then they erected ten english-type houses which were designed by Julius Gregory, one of them being completely furnished by Charles of London." H. & S. Sonn contracted Julius Gregory to develop house plans for single family houses in their new Sunny Ridge development, as it was termed. A new model was developed to construct homes that were of durable materials, to be resistant to exterior maintenance, using only brick, stone, and old-growth oak timber as exterior materials. The fashionable new neighborhood attracted the attention of New York banking, business, and entertainment elites, attracting Wall Street financier William Harty; then-owner of Condé Nast, Joseph J. Lane; Musical star Louise Groody; and Fitzhugh Green, of Putnam's Publishing House, among the first residents of the new neighborhood.

Sidney Sonn renovated farm's original house, an immense, elaborate, 20-room, 1875 Victorian mansion, into an English Tudor, designed by renowned architect Julius Gregory, father of the American Tudor-Revival style and movement of the 1920s, as a residence for himself.

Only a small handful of homes were sold and constructed before the economic downturn of the Great Depression. The remaining vast majority of homes were constructed beginning in the middle-1940s, with the last plots filled during the 1950s. The styles of the newer, 1940s-era homes was primarily of colonial revival style, with the newest ranging into Mid-century-Modern. The older, Tudor homes as a result remain quite notable.

The 1875 Sunny Ridge farm mansion was renovated to include a 14th-century woodcut from Europe, installed into the wall over the living room fireplace, among several other ancient relics, built into the home. The home was sold for the first time since the 1920s renovation in the summer of 2017, and was demolished to make way for two new homes. It was not protected by any state or local historic preservation acts.

Political history

In 1967, 200 residents stated support for a plan to incorporate Purchase, a community in Harrison, so that corporations could not build in the community. In response, officials from the Town of Harrison put forward plans to try to become a city to try to stop Purchase from seceding from Harrison. The resolution was for the Town became a hybrid "Town / Village", which it remains today.

John A. Passidomo (1921–2005) was first elected mayor in 1965 by only 67 votes. Re-elected eight times, he served until 1983 when he resigned to become Commissioner of the New York State Department of Motor Vehicles. In his two and a half years at that job, he helped pass one of the nation's first seat-belt laws despite the law's unpopularity.

Harrison's "Platinum Mile", a string of corporate office parks along I-287 in the Purchase section of Harrison, developed under Passidomo. The mayor played an instrumental role in attracting large corporations such as PepsiCo, MasterCard and Texaco.

In the early 1970s, under Passidomo's supervision, a group in the Purchase section of town, concerned about the town's overdevelopment, attempted to incorporate as a village and thereby separate from the town of Harrison. Creatively, to avoid being served papers that would have begun the legal proceedings for Purchase to incorporate as a village, Passidomo entered his office through the fire escape. He then immediately made sure that the town Harrison became a village but remained as a town to end to the possibility of Purchase's secession, since a village cannot legally be formed in another village.

The list of supervisors/mayors begins at 1965; however, there were mayors before that.
John Passidomo 1965–1983
Pat V. Angarano 1983–1990
Charles Balancia 1990–1994
Philip A. Marraccini (R) 1994–1998
Ronald Bianchi  (D) 1998–2002
Stephen Malfitano (R) 2002–2008
Joan Walsh (D) 2008–2012
Ronald Belmont (R) 2012–2022
Richard Dionisio (R) 2022-

Geography
The population was 27,472 at the 2010 census.

Harrison is bordered by North Castle, White Plains, Rye town, Rye city, Mamaroneck, and Scarsdale. The New England Thruway (I-95) runs through the town (without any interchanges), as well as the Cross Westchester Expressway and the Hutchinson River Parkway. I-684 passes through Harrison and ends at the Cross Westchester Expressway and the Hutchinson Parkway.

Climate

Areas and neighborhoods
The boundaries of the town of Harrison are the approximate shape of a figure-eight. The southern half is known as simply Harrison, or downtown, while the hamlets of Purchase and West Harrison are located in the northern portion of the town. The "downtown" southern half of Harrison is divided into four general areas: Brentwood Plaza, Sunnyridge, Sterling Ridge/The Trails, and the Village part of Harrison.

West Harrison is an isolated community, lodged between a tall hill bordered by a lake, Interstate 287, a tall relatively steep hill, and a cliff at the northern edge. Because of this, there is a general lack of street entrances. There is really only one road into it, although there are a few other "back" ways into it. The road is called Lake Street, flanked on one side by Silver Lake Park, bordering the lake, and by a small business district on the other side of the street. West Harrison contains the Passidomo Veterans Memorial Park and Pool and the Leo Mintzer Center. West Harrison also contains the site of the Battle of White Plains from the Revolutionary War. Silver Lake is also the home of Buckout Road, which was said to have been a home of witches, albinos, and slaughters.

Purchase is a more secluded area of Harrison, with winding roads and deep woods. The houses are larger, in often cases whole swaths of land developed in the late twentieth century, and early 2000s, comparably younger in age to the rest of the town.

Downtown is split into the four sections mentioned above, and is flanked by Interstate 95, the Hutchinson River Parkway, and the Metro-North Railroad. The manmade lines create isolation to areas, with few areas to cross each. Harrison's only middle school, Louis M. Klein Middle School, and only High School, Harrison High School, are located in the "downtown" area. The four areas of downtown, as separated by the boundaries of Interstate 95 and the railroad tracks as well as separated by wealth gaps, are very diverse. Despite its name, "Downtown" is not in any sense a business district, it is much rather a residential enclave, featuring houses of every wealth level.

Demographics

2000 census
At the 2000 census, there were 24,154 people, 8,394 households and 6,186 families residing in the village. The population density was 1,435.2 per square mile (554.1/km2). There were 8,680 housing units at an average density of 515.8 per square mile (199.1/km2). The racial makeup of the village was 89.78% White, 1.43% Black or African American, 0.09% Native American, 5.44% Asian, 0.01% Pacific Islander, 1.59% from other races, and 1.67% from two or more races. Hispanic or Latino of any race were 6.70% of the population.

There were 8,394 households, of which 35.3% had children under the age of 18 living with them, 62.4% were married couples living together, 8.7% had a female householder with no husband present, and 26.3% were non-families. 22.1% of all households were made up of individuals, and 8.7% had someone living alone who was 65 years of age or older. The average household size was 2.72 and the average family size was 3.20.

24.5% of residents were under the age of 18, 9.6% from 18 to 24, 29.4% from 25 to 44, 21.9% from 45 to 64, and 14.6% who were 65 years of age or older. The median age was 37 years. For every 100 females, there were 89.2 males. For every 100 females age 18 and over, there were 85.2 males.

According to a 2009 estimate, the median household income was $104,640, and the median family income was $130,224. The per capita income for the village was $63,742. About 4.2% of families and 5.6% of the population were below the poverty line, including 5.3% of those under age 18 and 7.8% of those age 65 or over.

2010 census
In the 2010 census the population was 76.9 percent non-Hispanic white, 2.4 percent African American, 7.5 percent Asian, and 11.7% Hispanic or Latino of any descent.

Economy
Harrison is and has been home to the corporate headquarters of several well-known companies, including the MasterCard headquarters, MasterCard International Global Headquarters, PepsiCo, and Central National-Gottesman. Atlas Air and subsidiary Polar Air Cargo have their headquarters in Purchase. Texaco's headquarters, a  building, was in Harrison. In 2002, after Chevron and Texaco merged, Chevron sold the former Texaco headquarters to Morgan Stanley. Morgan Stanley bought the building and the surrounding  for $42 million. Previously, Lenovo had its U.S. headquarters in Purchase. In 2006, the company announced it was moving to Morrisville, North Carolina.

Education

Public
Harrison Central School District operates Harrison High School, and Louis M. Klein Middle School, both located in the Downtown area. Additionally, the district also operates four public elementary schools. Purchase School serves Purchase, Preston School serves West Harrison, and Parsons School serves South Downtown. The fourth school, Harrison Avenue School, serves the remaining area of "Downtown", Sunnyridge, Sterling Ridge/The Trails, and The Brentwood.

Private
The Keio Academy of New York is a private high school located in Purchase.

The Windward School's Westchester campus is located nearby in White Plains, New York.

Colleges and universities
The State University of New York at Purchase and Manhattanville College are located in Purchase. In 2008, Fordham University opened its Westchester campus in West Harrison on 32 landscaped acres with a stream and pond.

Transportation

Roads
Harrison is traversed by several of Westchester County's major arteries.
  (Cross-Westchester Expressway) traverses the center of the town, between Purchase and Downtown. West Harrison is served by Exit 8 (NY 127). Downtown and Purchase are served by Exits 9 (Hutchinson River Parkway) and 10 (NY 120/NY 120A).
  (New England Thruway) crosses downtown, although no interchanges are located within Harrison.
  travels north from Interstate 287, and forms a border between West Harrison and Purchase. Harrison is served by exit 2 (Westchester County Airport), which is located in North Castle. Additionally, Harrison is served by the Manhattanville Road exit off the connector road between I-684 and the Hutchinson River Parkway.
  runs along the western edge of Downtown, forming a border between Harrison and White Plains. North of Interstate 287, the parkway turns eastward towards Rye Brook and Greenwich, Connecticut. Downtown is served by exits 23 (Mamaroneck Avenue), and 25 (NY 127/North Street). Purchase is served by exits 27 (NY 120), and 28 (Lincoln Avenue).

Harrison is served by several other significant roads.
  enters Harrison from the east near Rye's central business district. The route parallels the western edge of I-287 for several blocks, to Westchester Avenue, where NY 120 meets the southern end of NY 120A, an alternate route through Rye Brook. NY 120 follows Westchester Avenue, which forms collector/distributor roads running along I-287. About a half-mile west, NY 120 turns north, and passes through Purchase, where it intersects the Hutchinson River Parkway at exit 27. Continuing north, the route runs along the eastern edge of the campus of Manhattanville College, and passes a short distance west of the State University of New York at Purchase. The route continues north towards Westchester County Airport, and North Castle, as well as an intersection with I-684 at exit 2.
  terminates just inside of Harrison along Westchester Avenue.
  runs across downtown as Harrison Avenue and North Street. The route enters from Mamaroneck as Harrison Avenue, a short distance from its terminus at US 1. Some distance north, the route intersects Halstead Avenue, Downtown's main business strip. The route also intersects the New Haven Line, and has an intersection with the Hutchinson River Parkway on the White Plains/Harrison line (exit 25).

Bus

Harrison is served by several Bee-Line Bus routes.

Rail
Harrison is served by the New Haven Line of the Metro-North Railroad at the Harrison station, near the intersection of NY 127/Harrison Avenue and Halstead Avenue downtown.

Airport
Harrison is served by Westchester County Airport, which is partially located in Purchase.

Points of interest

Places of worship

Places of worship in Harrison include:

Roman Catholic
 St. Gregory the Great Church in Harrison
 St. Anthony of Padua Church in West Harrison

Orthodox Christians
 Greek Orthodox Church of Our Savior

Episcopalian
 All Saints Church in Harrison

Presbyterian
 Harrison Presbyterian Church in Harrison

Jewish
 Young Israel of Harrison
 Harrison Jewish Community Center

Cemeteries

There are several cemeteries in the downtown, including many small family plots dating back to the 17th century and before. Greenwood Union Cemetery is a cemetery shared by the city of Rye. There is also the Small Roman Catholic Cemetery dating back to when Harrison was first discovered in the 17th century. It is located right on the border of Rye and Harrison. This was a domain for Indian burials.

Country clubs
The Westchester Country Club, 
Apawamis Golf Club,and Harrison Meadows Country Club,  are all located in Harrison. All three of them are next to each other in the southern half ("downtown") portion of the town. A portion of Apawamis, including its entrance is located in Rye, New York. Harrison Meadows Country Club is a publicly owned club with membership open to all town residents.

The Purchase section of Harrison has Old oaks Country Club and Purchase Country Club along Purchase Street, Braeburn Country Club off Braeburn Drive, and Century Country Club along Anderson Hill Road.

Post offices
Harrison contains two post offices; one is located in the downtown section on Halstead Avenue, and the other is in Purchase, facing Purchase Street, near the intersection with Anderson Hill Road.

Historic sites
Harrison is home to several structures and sites listed on the National Register of Historic Places:

The Hadden-Margolis House 
A pre-revolutionary home, originally constructed around 1750, and added to the National Register of Historic Places in 2008.

Stony Hill Cemetery 
An African-American burial ground in use during the 19th century, added to the National Register in 1999.

United States Post Office 
A stone, Greek-revival building, featuring the Doric Order, built in 1938, and featuring a Works Progress Administration mural by Harold Goodwin  It was added to the National Register in 1989.

Revolutionary War Battle of North White Plains Battlefield

Fire department
Harrison is protected by one combination and two all-volunteer fire districts. The Harrison Fire Department being the combination department, the West Harrison Fire Department, and the Purchase Fire Department being all volunteer. The total fire apparatus amount in the town/village are three trucks, nine engines, two rescues, and many other special units. Altogether, there are 4 fire departments that protect Harrison.

Filming location
Harrison was used as a filming location in the movie Riding In Cars With Boys, the TV show Girls, the movie The English Teacher. In 1973, the cult pornographic movie The Devil in Miss Jones was filmed in a private house on Park Drive South.  Other movies include:
Unfaithful (2002)
The Beaver (2011)
The Wolf of Wall Street (2013)

Notable people

 Lou Bender (1910–2009), pioneer player with the Columbia Lions and in early pro basketball, who was later a successful trial attorney.
 Amelia Earhart (1897–1937), the aviator lived in Harrison in a home on what is now Amelia Earhart Lane off Locust Avenue while she was married to publisher George Putnam. A monument consisting of a bronze plaque with a propeller attached to a stone, was laid in a small park in Harrison after she became the first woman to fly solo across the Atlantic.
 Tex Fletcher (1909–1987), a singing cowboy with credits as a recording artist, Broadway and movie actor, night club performer, and radio and television personality.
 Ralph Friedgen (born 1947), former head football coach at the University of Maryland from 2001 to 2010.
 Bobby Gonzalez, former men's basketball coach for the Seton Hall Pirates.
Fitzhugh Green, of Putnam's Publishing House.
Louise Groody, musical star and actress, resided in Harrison beginning in 1928.
 Bobby Jordan (1923–1965), one of the Dead End Kids
 Rick Marotta, drummer and composer of the theme song for Everybody Loves Raymond.
 John McGillicuddy (1930–2009), CEO of Manufacturer's Hanover Trust and then, after its merger with Chemical Bank, its CEO in the 1990s.
 George P. Putnam (1887–1950), publisher and husband of Amelia Earhart.
 Mariano Rivera (born 1969), pitcher with the New York Yankees.
 Scott Rogowsky, host of HQ Trivia.
 Brothers Eric and Jeff Rosenthal, the hip-hop sketch comedians collectively known as ItsTheReal.
 Gene Sarazen (1902–1999, born Eugenio Saraceni) American golfer.
Kenneth Cole (born 1954) fashion designer and entrepreneur

Notes

References

Bibliography

External links
 Town/Village of Harrison official website

 
Towns in Westchester County, New York
Towns in the New York metropolitan area
Villages in Westchester County, New York
Populated places established in 1696
1696 establishments in the Province of New York
Villages in New York (state)